The 1929 VFL Grand Final was an Australian rules football game contested between the Collingwood Football Club and Richmond Football Club, held at the Melbourne Cricket Ground in Melbourne on 28 September 1929. It was the 31st annual Grand Final of the Victorian Football League, staged to determine the premiers for the 1929 VFL season. The match, attended by 63,236 spectators, was won by Collingwood by a margin of 29 points, marking that club's eighth premiership victory and third in succession.

History 
Collingwood’s 1929 season was extremely successful. They won all 18 games of the home-and-away season, a record that still stand today. Gordon Coventry became the first player to kick 100 goals in a season (124 in total), and Albert Collier won the Brownlow Medal.

While Collingwood finished on top of the ladder, Carlton were second on 15 wins, Richmond on 12 wins and a draw and St Kilda on 12 wins. The 2nd Semi-Final saw the upset of the season, with the rugged and determined Tigers beating the Magpies by 62 points for Collingwood's only loss of the season. They went on to beat Carlton in the Preliminary Final with a thrilling finish; Jack Titus scored the winning goal right on the bell. A third Collingwood v Richmond Grand Final was scheduled.

In the week leading up to the Grand Final, Collingwood received handwritten anonymous letters, threatening the lives of eleven prominent players. They were intercepted by officials and withheld from the players until after the game.

Match summary 

Richmond kicked the first goal of the day but wasted opportunities for the rest of the quarter. Collingwood took advantage and led by 27 points at half time, a lead they held for the rest of the match. The two teams fought determinedly and, quite often, outside the spirit of the game. Bob Makeham was knocked senseless in the 2nd quarter, although he played on despite concussion.

While Gordon Coventry kicked only 2 goals for the day, the attention that the Richmond defence paid him allowed Horrie ‘Tubby’ Edmonds to fulfill the most important day of his footballing life, kicking 5 goals playing deep near the boundary line in attack.

Charlie Ahern, 24 years old and playing in only his third VFL match, provided inspiration to the side. His main role was to protect Syd Coventry and, despite fracturing his arm, he battled on manfully, and held his own in what was, at times, a physically spiteful match. Ahern was to die only 18 months later from rectal cancer.

Collingwood won by 29 points, attributable to the Magpies’ rock-solid defence, Edmonds' 5 goals and that players carried on in the face of serious injuries.

Match statistics

 Umpire  -  R Scott
 Attendance  -  63,366
 Gate  -  £3,227

Teams

See also
 1929 VFL season

References 

 Atkinson, Graeme: The Complete Book of AFL Finals, 1996.   
 McFarlane, Glenn and Roberts, Michael: The Machine - The Inside Story of  Football's Greatest Team, 2005.

External links

Games you may have missed: State Library of Victoria Australian Rules research guide

VFL/AFL Grand Finals
Grand
Collingwood Football Club
Richmond Football Club
September 1929 sports events